Sanger is a surname. Notable people with the surname include:

 Alexander C. Sanger, American reproductive rights activist 
 Andrew Sanger (born 1948), British travel writer
 Casper Sanger (1836–1897), American politician
 Clyde Sanger (born 1928), English journalist, first Africa correspondent for The Guardian newspaper
 David Sanger (organist) (1947–2010), English organist
 David Sanger (drummer), American drummer
 David E. Sanger (born 1960), American journalist, with The New York Times
 Eleanor Sanger (1929–1993), American Television Sports Producer
 Elliott Sanger (1897–1989), American radio station founder
 Esther R. Sanger (1926–1995), American humanitarian
 Frederick Sanger (1918-2013), English biochemist
 Lord George Sanger, (1825-1911), English circus proprietor
 George Sanger (musician), American video game music composer
 Jedediah Sanger (1751-1829), American politician and businessman
 John Sanger (1816–1889), English circus proprietor
 Larry Sanger (born 1968), co-founder of Wikipedia and founder of Citizendium
 Margaret Sanger (1879–1966), American birth control activist
 Percival Sanger (1899—1968), English cricketer and an officer in both the British Army and the British Indian Army
 Peter Sanger (born 1943), Canadian poet and prose writer
 Ruth Sanger (born 1918), Australian haematologist and serologist
 Stephen Sanger (born 1946), American businessman, chairman and CEO of General Mills
 William Sanger (1885–1975), American doctor, past president of the Medical College of Virginia

See also 
 Saenger (disambiguation) for Sänger and Saenger
 Senger
 Singer (surname)
 Singermann